The 1828 United States presidential election in Mississippi took place between October 31 and December 2, 1828, as part of the 1828 United States presidential election. Voters chose three representatives, or electors to the Electoral College, who voted for President and Vice President.

Mississippi voted for the Democratic candidate, Andrew Jackson, over the National Republican candidate, John Quincy Adams. Jackson won Mississippi by a margin of 62.1%.

Results

References

Mississippi
1828
1828 Mississippi elections